The Irish Socialist Federation (ISF) was an organization which was active in the United States and was founded by James Connolly and others. It had branches in New York and Chicago. In March 1907, a céili was held to launch the organization. The aim of the party was to raise  class consciousness among Irish emigrants in America. Members included James Connolly, ex-ISRP members Jack Mulray and John Lyng, Patrick L. Quinlan, and Elizabeth Gurley Flynn. It was initially aligned to the Socialist Labor Party of America, but later supported the Socialist Party of America. The official newspaper of the organization was known as 'The Harp'.

References

External links
Declaration of Principles of the Irish Socialist Federation by James Connolly in The Harp (1908)
1907 establishments in the United States
Anti-imperialist organizations
Defunct socialist organizations in the United States
Irish-American culture in Chicago
Irish-American culture in New York City
Irish republican organisations
Organizations established in 1907
Socialist Labor Party of America
Factions of the Socialist Party of America